Sarah Feigin (1 July 1928 – 24 April 2011) was a Latvian music educator and composer who lived and worked in Israel.

Early life
She was born in Latvia, and studied piano and composition at the Jāzeps Vītols Latvian Academy of Music originally known as the Riga Conservatory of Music. She graduated with bachelor's and master's degrees. She moved to Israel in 1972 and founded a Conservatory of Music in Holon in 1973, working as its director until 1983. Feigin worked for "Jeunesses Musicales d'Israel" from 1973 to 1990, organizing concerts for youth. Her music has been performed internationally.

Musical Achievements
Sarah would teach children as well as teach at music education institutions when she lived in Israel. Her preferred instruments are organ and piano when composing music. Her work has been published by the Israel Music Institute, and her pieces have been on the Israeli radio on a regular basis. 
Sarah Feigin composed pieces such as, chamber music, music for piano, educational pieces, songs for ballets, and vocal music.

In 2000, Sarah received an award for her work "Thoughts On Playing" at the International Composition Competition in Miami, Florida.

She has written songs for the piano that involve four hands and up to six hands at once. 
Some pieces include,
Shoshana, for piano 6 hands
Composed in 1995
Tumbalalaika, for piano 4 hands
Composed in 1995
Yism'chu Hashamayim, for piano 4 hands 
Composed in 1996
Four Hits, arr. for piano 4 hands 
Composed in 2001

On October 9, 2012 an album called Clarinet Repertoire Of Women Composers was released, and the last song is the Fantasia for Clarinet and Piano by Sarah Feigin – Written in 1996, in Israel. 

In 2018, the album "Piano Works by Sara Feigin" was released. The recording focuses on her solo piano music and mostly includes either unperformed or previously unrecorded works, many based on traditional folk songs. The pieces are performed by British-born and Israeli-based pianist Benjamin Goodman.

Personal life
Sarah's birth name was  Sarah Kugel , which changed when she married Oscar Feigin who was a professor of polymer chemistry. Sarah gave birth to Ilana and Carmela, then she left Latvia in 1972, to help her family emigrate to Israel. This gave her a new sense of creativity, which led to some of her compositions to have certain elements of Israeli folk music. 
She died in Holon, Israel, on April 24, 2011 of a serious illness.

Works
She has published arrangements of Israeli songs and progressive pedagogical studies. Selected works and their years composed include:

Autumn Song, for alto-saxophone & piano – 2003
Awakening, for 2 clarinets and Piano – 2005
Balayla al Hadashe (At night on the grass) arr. For piano 4 hands – 2001
Beauty of Songs, for voice & piano – 1997
Bei mir bis du shein arr. For piano 4 hands – 2001
Besame Mucho (Kiss me again) arr. For piano 4 hands – 2001
Caravan, for flute, clarinet & piano – 1995
Concerto for Clarinet & String Orchestra – 2001
Elegie in Memoriam Yitzhak Rabin, for piano trio – 1995
Fantasia for Clarinet & Piano – 1996
Fantasia for Clarinet and String Quartet – 2009
String Quartet, Solo instrument + ensemble 
Fantasia for Flute & Harp – 2005
Fantasia For Two Clarinets & Piano – 1999
Festive Songs For Piano, Book III, solo piano – 1989
Four Hits, arr. for piano 4-hands, solo piano – 2001
Four Scenes, for piano – 1992
Humoresque and Habanera, for violin and piano – 1991
In The Name Of..., for voice & piano – 2001
Kaleidoscope, for orchestra – 2002
Kyle-Yana, for alto-saxophone & piano – 2002
Listen, symphonic poem, for solo voice & symphony orchestra – 1973
Lugubre, for cello & piano – 1995
Nigunim, for clarinet & piano – 1998
Playing Together, Songs for Piano 4 hand – 2002
Prayer for violin and piano – 1987
Reflections on a Niggun for clarinet and piano – 1999
Reflections on a Niggun for violin and piano – 1999
Rhapsody for Cello and Piano – 2000
Russian Dance for symphony orchestra – 1969
Shoshana for Piano, 6 hands – 1995
Sonata for piano – 1972
Sonata for violin and piano – 1976 
Songs for Piano No. 1, first steps for young pianists – 1989
Songs for Piano No. 2, first steps for young pianists – 1989
Spring Song, for alto saxophone and piano – 2003
The Book of Animals, ten easy piano pieces – 1994
The Book of Animals No. 2, six pieces for piano – 1996
The Cat's House, Opera for Children – 1987
Tumbalalaika, for piano 4 hands – 1995
Two Pieces for Piano – 2003
Valse Fantasia, for violin & piano – 1997
Variations, for piano – 2002
Viva España, arr. For piano 4 hands – 2001
When Peace Comes, for two violins – 1997
Yism'chu Hashamayim, for piano 4 hands – 1996

References

1928 births
2011 deaths
20th-century classical composers
Music educators
Women classical composers
Israeli Jews
Latvian composers
Latvian Jews
Israeli people of Latvian-Jewish descent
Jewish classical composers
Latvian emigrants to Israel
Latvian Academy of Music alumni
Women music educators
20th-century women composers